Dr. Carlos Augusto R. Santos-Neves (born 1944) was the Brazilian ambassador to the United Kingdom from 2008 to 2010 He was succeeded in that post by Roberto Jaguaribe. 

Prior to that, Santos-Neves had been ambassador to Russia, Canada and Mexico and Consul General of Brazil in New York.

References

Brazilian diplomats
Living people
1944 births
People from Rio de Janeiro (city)
Ambassadors of Brazil to the United Kingdom
Ambassadors of Brazil to Russia
Ambassadors of Brazil to Canada
Ambassadors of Brazil to Mexico